Charles Edward Kirby, Jr. (born November 27, 1974) is a former American football fullback who played for the Tampa Bay Buccaneers of the National Football League. He played college football at the University of Virginia.

College career 
Kirby played with the Virginia Cavaliers from 1994 to 1997, lettering in all four years. Utilized primarily as a lead blocker, he carried the ball 34 times for 116 yards and caught 12 passes for 126 yards, recording one touchdown. While at Virginia, Kirby was a teammate of Ronde Barber, who he later played with as a Tampa Bay Buccaneer.

Professional career

Indianapolis Colts 
Kirby signed with the Indianapolis Colts on April 24, 1998, though he spent the whole 1998 season on the injured reserve list due to an Achilles injury. The Colts released him on September 6, 1999.

Kansas City Chiefs 
Kirby was signed to the Kansas City Chiefs' practice squad in the second half of the 1999 season, never playing a game with the Chiefs. He was released by the Chiefs on August 22, 2000.

Tampa Bay Buccaneers 
On September 12, 2000, Kirby was signed to the Tampa Bay Buccaneers' practice squad. He was promoted to the active roster on November 9 and played six games with the team in 2000, two of which he started. Prior to the 2001 season, Kirby suffered another Achilles injury, which proved to be season-ending. He was placed on injured reserve on August 10, 2001, and became a free agent on February 15, 2002.

Chicago Bears 
Kirby signed a two-year contract with the Chicago Bears on April 29, 2002, but he was released on July 15.

After football 
In 2010, Kirby pledged to donate his brain and spinal cord tissue to the Center for the Study of Traumatic Encephalopathy at the Boston University School of Medicine.

References 

1974 births
Living people
American football fullbacks
Chicago Bears players
Indianapolis Colts players
Kansas City Chiefs players
Players of American football from North Carolina
Tampa Bay Buccaneers players
Virginia Cavaliers football players